Loch Lomond was a community in Newfoundland and Labrador near St. Andrews. It had a population of 67 in 1956.

See also
 List of communities in Newfoundland and Labrador

Populated places in Newfoundland and Labrador